Ephialtias is a genus of moths of the family Notodontidae. It consists of the following species:
abrupta species group:
Ephialtias abrupta (Hübner, 1806)
Ephialtias choba (Druce, 1899)
Ephialtias consueta (Walker, 1854)
Ephialtias dorsispilota Warren, 1905
Ephialtias monilis (Hübner, 1806)
Ephialtias pseudena (Boisduval, 1870)
Ephialtias velutinum (Butler, 1878)
bryce species group:
Ephialtias bryce (Walker, 1854)
Ephialtias draconis (Druce, 1885)
Ephialtias tenuifascia (Prout, 1918)

Notodontidae of South America